Popnoname is the artist name of Jens-Uwe Beyer (born 1978 in Fehmarn).  He lives in Cologne.

Apart from his regular releases on Kompakt's Pop Ambient series, he has had a 
number of 12" releases on Cologne-based labels, including Firm and Italic.  
His debut album White Album (Italic) was released in 2007, and got loads of positive reviews from the German and international press.
The last album was Surrounded by Weather (Italic) along with two 12" Remix Maxis and a Bonus Ep.
He recently remixed Eurythmics and Brian Eno & Cluster for the German Recordlabel Grönland.

Concerts
Jens-Uwe Beyer can already look back on a number of live performances, e.g.: 
Monterrey (Mexico, Aura Club), Thessaloniki (Liebe.!),  Porto (Passos Manuell), 
Amsterdam (Paradiso), Vienna (Icke Micke), Moscow (Solyanka, Propaganda), Hamburg (Übel & 
Gefährlich), Berlin (Panorama Bar), New York (Bunker), Cambridge (Middlesex 
Lounge), Tokio (Seco) and London (The End).

Collaborations

He is member of Cologne Tape (Barnt, Crato, Jan Philipp Janzen (Von Spar), Michaela Dippel (Ada), Axel Willner (The Field), Jörg Burger (The Modernist) and John Stanier (Battles) 
and Co-Founder of the Label Magazine.

Discography 
Piece (12") 		                Firm 	2005
You Are Popnoname (12") 		Italic 	2006
I Want You For Popnoname (12") 	Firm 	2006
Credits (12") 		                Italic 	2006
London Paris New York (12") 		Italic 	2007
White Album (CD,2xLP, Album) 		Italic 	2007
Surrounded by Weather (CD,LP, ALBUM)   Italic 	2008
Surrounded by Weather REMIX 1 (12")    Italic 	2008
Surrounded by Weather Bonus Ep (12")   Italic 	2008
Spaces (12")                           Pop!    2009
Hello Gorgeous (12")                   Kompakt 2010

Popnoname appears on:
Pop Ambient 2005 (CD,LP) 	Gold 	Kompakt 	2004
Pop Ambient 2006 (CD,LP) 	Wandel 	Kompakt 	2005
Pop Ambient 2007 (CD,LP) 	Hafen 	Kompakt 	2006
Pop Ambient 2008 (CD,LP) 	Fembria 	Kompakt 	2007
Pop Ambient 2009 (CD,LP) 	Nightliner 	Kompakt 	2009
Pop Ambient 2010 (CD,LP) 	Deutz Air 	Kompakt 	2010
Conny Plank Tribute (CD,LP)   2013

External links 
Official Website

German electronic musicians
Living people
1978 births